The Natural History was The Natural History's first recording with Startime International on April 6–7, 2002, which was released later that year.

Track listing
 "Telling Lies Will Get You No Where" – 2:49
 "The Progress Chart" – 3:13
 "So He'll Say" – 3:08
 "The Right Hand" – 2:58
 "Broken Language" – 1:45

Reviews
 Allmusic review

2002 EPs
The Natural History (band) albums
Startime International albums